Miercurea Nirajului is a town in Mureș County, Romania. It lies in the Székely Land, an ethno-cultural region in eastern Transylvania.

The following seven villages are administered by the town:
 Beu / Székelybő
 Dumitreștii / Demeterfalva
 Laureni / Kisszentlőrinc
 Moșuni / Székelymoson
 Șardu Nirajului / Székelysárd
 Tâmpa / Székelytompa
 Veța / Vece

The town is the site of the Miercurea Nirajului gas field.

History

The town is part of the Székely Land region of the historical Transylvania province.  Its first written mention is from 1493 as Oppidum Zereda. István Bocskay was elected here as prince of Transylvania in 1604.

Until 1918, the town belonged to the Maros-Torda County of the Kingdom of Hungary. After the Hungarian–Romanian War of 1918–19 and the Treaty of Trianon of 1920, it became part of Romania.

Demographics

The commune has a Székely Hungarian majority. According to the 2011 census, it has a population of 5,554 of which 83.3% are Hungarian, 10.4% Romanians, and 6.3% Roma.

Natives
Zoltan Lunka

References

External links 

Populated places in Mureș County
Localities in Transylvania
Towns in Romania